Gustavo Alfredo Neffa Rodríguez (born 30 November 1971 in Asunción) is a retired footballer from Paraguay.

He started his career on Olimpia Asunción, and at the age of 18, noted by Juventus, Neffa moved on loan to Serie A club U.S. Cremonese. He returned in South America in 1992, playing for Boca Juniors , before leaving football and marrying tennis player Rossana de los Ríos, who gave him a daughter. He also made a short comeback as a player/coach to Dallas Burn in 2000, just appearing on one pre-season match. He also appeared at the 1992 Summer Olympics in the Paraguayan football team, playing a single match against Ghana; it was during this experience that Neffa met his future wife Rossana.

Italian musician Neffa took his name as a homage to Gustavo. Today they are known to be good friends 
.

International 
Neffa made his international debut for the Paraguay national football team on 1 July 1989 in the 1989 Copa América match against Peru (5–2) win, in which he scored once (2–1). He obtained a total number of 15 international caps, scoring four goals for the national side.

References

External links
 

Living people
1971 births
Paraguayan footballers
Paraguay international footballers
1989 Copa América players
1991 Copa América players
Paraguayan Primera División players
Club Olimpia footballers
Club Sol de América footballers
Serie A players
Serie B players
U.S. Cremonese players
Unión de Santa Fe footballers
Boca Juniors footballers
Estudiantes de La Plata footballers
FC Dallas players
Argentine Primera División players
Expatriate footballers in Argentina
Expatriate soccer players in the United States
Paraguayan expatriate footballers
Paraguayan expatriate sportspeople in Italy
Expatriate footballers in Italy
Association football forwards
Olympic footballers of Paraguay
Footballers at the 1992 Summer Olympics
Sportspeople from Asunción